Fun-Fare is the eleventh studio album by Japanese music duo Every Little Thing. It was released on February 19, 2014, by Avex Trax.

Background 
This is the band's first album in two and a half years, and includes singles from "Landscape", which was used in TV commercials for Toyota Isis and released as single in late 2011, to  "Aquamarine no Mama de Ite", originally a cover from Carlos Toshiki & Omega Tribe and used as theme song of Fuji TV drama Dakishimetai! Forever, released digitally in August 2013.

"Start", which was used on TV Tokyo coverage of the 2014 Winter Olympics, was released digitally on February 5, 2014.

Chart performance 
In its first week, Fun-Fare charted at number seven on the Oricon charts, selling 9,891 copies.  On its second week it fell abruptly to the 50th position on the charts, selling 2,141 copies (a total of 12,032 copies sold).

Track listing 

Notes
 co-arranged by Every Little Thing
 co-arranged by Ichiro Ito

Charts

References 

2014 albums
Every Little Thing (band) albums